Frank Rochon (born April 18, 1953 in Laval, Quebec) is a retired professional ice hockey player who played 255 games in the World Hockey Association.  He played for the  Chicago Cougars, Denver Spurs, Ottawa Civics and the Indianapolis Racers.

References 

1953 births
Living people
Binghamton Dusters players
Canadian ice hockey left wingers
Denver Spurs (WHA) players
Chicago Cougars draft picks
Chicago Cougars players
Ice hockey people from Quebec
Indianapolis Racers players
Laval Saints players
Mohawk Valley Comets (NAHL) players
Ottawa Civics players
Sherbrooke Castors players
Sportspeople from Laval, Quebec
Toronto Maple Leafs draft picks